An infrared search and track (IRST) system (sometimes known as infrared sighting and tracking) is a method for detecting and tracking objects which give off infrared radiation, such as the infrared signatures of jet aircraft and helicopters.

IRST is a generalized case of forward looking infrared (FLIR), i.e. from forward-looking to all-round situation awareness. Such systems are passive (thermographic camera), meaning they do not give out any radiation of their own, unlike radar. This gives them the advantage that they are difficult to detect.

However, because the atmosphere attenuates infrared to some extent (although not as much as visible light) and because adverse weather can attenuate it also (again, not as badly as visible systems), the range compared to a radar is limited. Within range, angular resolution is better than radar due to the shorter wavelength.

History

Early systems 

The first use of an IRST system appears to be the F-101 Voodoo, F-102 Delta Dagger and F-106 Delta Dart interceptors. The F-106 had an early IRST mounting replaced in 1963 with a production retractable mount. The IRST was also incorporated into the Vought F-8 Crusader (F-8E variant) which allowed passive tracking of heat emissions and was similar to the later Texas Instruments AAA-4 installed on early F-4 Phantoms.

The F-4 Phantom had a Texas Instruments AAA-4 infrared seeker under the nose of early production aircraft F-4B's and F-4C's and not installed on later F-4-D's due to limited capabilities, but retained the bulge and indeed some F-4D's had the IRST receiver retrofitted in a modified form.

The F-4E eliminated the AAA-4 IRST bulge and received an internal gun mount which took up the area under the nose. The F-4J which had a pulse-Doppler radar also eliminated the AAA-4 IRST receiver and bulge under the nose.

The first use of IRST in an Eastern European country was the Mikoyan-Gurevich MiG-23 The MiG-23 used the (TP-23ML) IRST and later versions used the (26SH1) IRST. The Mikoyan-Gurevich MiG-25PD was also equipped with a small IRST under the nose.

The Swedish Saab J-35F2 Draken (1965) also used an IRST, a Hughes Aircraft Company N71.

Later systems 
IRST systems re-appeared on more modern designs starting in the 1980s with the introduction of 2-D sensors, which cued both horizontal and vertical angle. Sensitivities were also greatly improved, leading to better resolution and range. In more recent years, new systems have entered the market. In 2015, Northrop Grumman introduced its OpenPod(TM) IRST pod, which uses a sensor by Leonardo.

While IRST systems are most common amongst aircraft, land-based, ship and submarine systems are available.

Distributed Aperture Systems 

The F-35 equipped infrared search and track system AN/AAQ-37 Distributed Aperture System (DAS), which consists of six IR sensors around the aircraft for full spherical coverage, providing day/night imaging and acting as an IRST and missile approach warning system.

Chengdu J-20 and Shenyang FC-31 shares the similar design concept with their EORD-31 system that provides 360 degree IRST coverage. IRST systems can also be used to detect stealth aircraft, in some cases, outperforming traditional radar.

Technology 
These were fairly simple systems consisting of an infra-red sensor with a horizontally rotating shutter in front of it. The shutter was slaved to a display under the main interception radar display in the cockpit. Any IR light falling on the sensor would generate a "pip" on the display, in a fashion similar to the B-scopes used on early radars.

The display was primarily intended to allow the radar operator to manually turn the radar to the approximate angle of the target, in an era when radar systems had to be "locked on" by hand. The system was considered to be of limited utility, and with the introduction of more automated radars they disappeared from fighter designs for some time.

Performance 
Detection range varies with external factors such as
 clouds
 altitude
 air temperature
 target's attitude
 target's speed

The higher the altitude, the less dense the atmosphere and the less infrared radiation it absorbs - especially at longer wavelengths. The effect of reduction in friction between air and aircraft does not compensate the better transmission of infrared radiation. Therefore, infrared detection ranges are longer at high altitudes.

At high altitudes, temperatures range from −30 to −50 °C - which provide better contrast between aircraft temperature and background temperature.

The Eurofighter Typhoon's PIRATE IRST can detect subsonic fighters from 50 km from front and 90 km from rear - the larger value being the consequence of directly observing the engine exhaust, with an even greater increase being possible if the target uses afterburners.

The range at which a target can be sufficiently confidently identified to decide on weapon release is significantly inferior to the detection range - manufacturers have claimed it is about 65% of detection range.

Tactics

With infrared homing or fire-and-forget missiles, the fighter may be able to fire upon the target without having to turn its radar sets on at all. Otherwise, the fighter can turn the radar on and achieve a lock immediately before firing if desired. The fighter could also close to within cannon range and engage that way.

Whether or not they use their radar, the IRST system can still allow them to launch a surprise attack.

An IRST system may also have a regular magnified optical sight slaved to it, to help the IRST-equipped aircraft identify the target at long range. As opposed to an ordinary forward looking infrared system, an IRST system will actually scan the space around the aircraft similarly to the way in which mechanically (or even electronically) steered radars work. The exception to the scanning technique is the F-35's DAS, which stares in all directions simultaneously, and automatically detects and declares aircraft and missiles in all directions, without a limit to the number of targets simultaneously tracked.

When they find one or more potential targets they will alert the pilot(s) and display the location of each target relative to the aircraft on a screen, much like a radar. Again similarly to the way a radar works, the operator can tell the IRST to track a particular target of interest, once it has been identified, or scan in a particular direction if a target is believed to be there (for example, because of an advisory from AWACS or another aircraft).

IRST systems can incorporate laser rangefinders in order to provide full fire-control solutions for cannon fire or launching missiles (Optronique secteur frontal). The combination of an atmospheric propagation model, the apparent surface of the target, and target motion analysis (TMA) IRST can calculate the range.

The United States Air Force is currently seeking an IRST system for its F-15 aircraft.

List of modern IRST systems 

The best known modern IRST systems are:
 
 Chengdu J-10B/C
 Shenyang J-11/15/16 
 Chengdu J-20 (EORD-31 with 360 degree IRST coverage named Distributed aperture system)
 Shenyang FC-31 (Electro-optical targeting system)
 
 Classe Orizzonte frigate (Safran Vampir MB)
 ROKS Dokdo amphibious assault ship (Safran Vampir MB)
 Sejong the Great-class destroyer (Safran Vampir NG)
 Anzac-class frigate (Safran Vampir NG)
 Canberra-class landing helicopter dock (Safran Vampir NG)
 Hobart-class destroyer (Safran Vampir NG)
 Cassard-class frigate (Safran EOMS-NG)
 Floréal-class frigate (Safran EOMS-NG)
 Horizon-class frigate (Safran EOMS-NG)
 Baynunah-class corvette (Safran EOMS-NG)
 Gowind-class OPV for Argentina (Safran EOMS-NG)
 Aircraft carrier Charles de Gaulle (Thales ARTEMIS)
 FREMM (Thales ARTEMIS)
 Dassault Rafale (Safran/Thales Optronique secteur frontal OSF)
 
 Aircraft carrier Cavour (Leonardo SASS)
 FREMM (Leonardo SASS)
 Doha-class corvette (Leonardo SASS)
 Musherib-class offshore patrol vessel (Leonardo SASS)
 Saab JAS 39 Gripen E/F (Leonardo Skyward-G)
 LHD Trieste  (Leonardo DSS-IRST)
  /  /  
Eurofighter Typhoon (EuroFIRST PIRATE)
 
 Halifax-class frigate (Thales Nederland Sirius)
 De Zeven Provinciën-class frigate (Thales Nederland Sirius)
 Sachsen-class frigate (Thales Nederland Sirius)
 
 Su-27/30/33/35/37 Flanker (OEPS-27/30; OLS-35)
 Mikoyan MiG-31(8TK)
 MiG-29/35 (OEPS-29/OLS-13SM-1)
 Sukhoi Su-57 (101KS-V)
 
 ROKS Marado amphibious assault ship (Hanwha SAQ-600K)
 Daegu-class frigate (Hanwha SAQ-600K)
 KAI KF-21 Boramae
 
 F110-class frigate (Indra/Tecnobit IRST i110)

 Block-1/2/3 Thunder JF 17

JAS-39E/F Gripen NG (Skyward-G)
 
 Barbaros-class frigate (Aselsan PIRI)
 TCG Anadolu (Aselsan PIRI)
 Istanbul-class frigate (Aselsan PIRI)
 
 Grumman F-14 Tomcat (AN/AAS-42 IRST)
 McDonnell Douglas F-15C Eagle (Lockheed Martin Legion Pod)
 Boeing F-15K/SG Strike Eagle (AN/AAS-42 “Tiger Eyes”)
 Boeing F-15SA/QA/IA/EX Advanced Eagle (“Tiger Eyes”)
  Lockheed Martin F-16C/D (Lockheed Martin Legion Pod)
 Lockheed Martin F-16E/F Block 60/62 (AN/AAQ-32 IFTS)
 Boeing F/A-18E/F Super Hornet Block III (IRST21)
 Lockheed Martin F-22 Raptor (long range AIRST)
 Lockheed Martin F-35 Lightning II (AN/AAQ-40 EOTS, AN/AAQ-37 DAS)
 Arleigh Burke-class guided missile destroyer (Mark 46 Mod 1 on Flight I/II/IIA, Mark 20 Mod 1 on Flight III)
 Phalanx CIWS Block 1B

These fighter aircraft carry the IRST systems for use instead of radar when the situation warrants it, such as when shadowing other aircraft, under the control of airborne early warning and control (AWACS) aircraft, or executing a ground-controlled interception (GCI), where an external radar is used to help vector the fighter to a target and the IRST is used to pick up and track the target once the fighter is in range.

See also 
 Electro-optical targeting system
 AN/AAQ-37 electro-optical distributed aperture system

References

Citations

Bibliography 
 Eden, Paul ed. The Encyclopedia of Modern Military Aircraft. London: Amber Books Ltd, 2004. 
 Kinzey, Bert. F-106 Delta Dart, in Detail & Scale. Fallbrook, CA: Aero Publishers, 1983. .
 Sweetman, Bill and Bonds, Ray. The Great Book of Modern Warplanes. New York, New York: Crown Publishers, 1987.

External links 

 Fraunhofer Institut IAF annual report 2006 German and English.

Targeting (warfare)
Military aviation
Military electronics
Infrared imaging